Jia County or Jiaxian is a county under the administration of Pingdingshan City, in south-central Henan Province, China.

Jia county is famous for Heluo noodles, the Three-Su Temple and Linfeng village.

Three-Su Temple is the place where the famous poets Su Xun, Su Shi and Su Zhe are buried.

For Linfeng village, its traditional red stone architectures have high historical and cultural value with obvious local characteristics.

Administrative divisions
As 2012, this county is divided to 6 towns, 7 townships and 1 ethic townships.
Towns

Townships

Ethnic townships
Yaozhuang Hui Township

Climate

References

External links
Official website of Jia County Government

County-level divisions of Henan
Pingdingshan